King of the Lumberjacks is a 1940 American Western film directed by William Clemens and starring John Payne, Gloria Dickson and Stanley Fields.

The film's sets were designed by the art director Esdras Hartley.

Partial cast
 John Payne as James 'Jim' 'Slim' Abbott 
 Gloria Dickson as Tina Martin Deribault 
 Stanley Fields as Dominic Deribault 
 Joe Sawyer as Jigger, a Lumberjack 
 Victor Kilian as Joe 
 Earl Dwire as Dr. Vance 
 Herbert Heywood as Laramie, Train Engineer 
 G. Pat Collins as Mr. Gregg, Parole Officer 
 John Sheehan as Bartender 
 Pat West as Second Waiter 
 Nat Carr as 'Shorty', First Waiter 
 Jack Mower as 'Red', Truck Driver 
 John 'Skins' Miller as 'Cooky', the Camp Cook

References

Bibliography
 Pitts, Michael R. Western Movies: A Guide to 5,105 Feature Films. McFarland, 2012.

External links
 

1940 films
1940 Western (genre) films
American Western (genre) films
Films directed by William Clemens
Warner Bros. films
American black-and-white films
Films set in forests
Films about lumberjacks
1940s English-language films
1940s American films